Olivier Tielemans (born June 1, 1984 in Weert) is a Dutch race car driver. His career started back in 1991 when he came 4th in the Dutch Kart Championship. Between 1995 and 1997 he raced in the Belgian Kart Championship and became Rookie of The Year. He didn't race again until 2002 when he raced in the Italian and European Formula Renault Championships. In 2003 he finished 4th in the Benelux Formula Renault Championship. In 2004 he competed in the last six races of the FIA Formula 3000 Championship. For the 2005 season he raced in the 3000 ProSeries. In 2006 he raced in the DTM with the Futurecom TME in an Audi A4. He was team mate to Belgian woman race car driver Vanina Ickx. He was replaced after 3 races because of problems with the management. In 2007 he raced in the WTCC for Alfa Romeo.

In 2008 he will continue to compete in the WTCC, but for Wiechers-Sport in a BMW 320si.

Racing record

Complete International Formula 3000 results
(key) (Races in bold indicate pole position; races in italics indicate fastest lap.)

Complete DTM results
(key)

External links 
Official website

1984 births
Living people
Dutch racing drivers
World Touring Car Championship drivers
Deutsche Tourenwagen Masters drivers
Dutch Formula Renault 2.0 drivers
Italian Formula Renault 2.0 drivers
Formula Renault Eurocup drivers
International Formula 3000 drivers
Blancpain Endurance Series drivers
Sportspeople from Weert

Audi Sport drivers
Kolles Racing drivers
Team Astromega drivers
MP Motorsport drivers
Porsche Carrera Cup Germany drivers